The Beast is a nickname which may refer to:

 Calvin Abueva (born 1988), Filipino basketball player
 Adhiban Baskaran (born 1992), Indian chess Grandmaster
 Adebayo Akinfenwa (born 1982), English football player
 Júlio Baptista (born 1981), Brazilian football player
 Yohan Blake (born 1989), Jamaican sprinter
 Aleister Crowley (born 1875), English occultist, ceremonial magician, poet, painter, novelist, and mountaineer
 Jimmie Foxx (1907–1967), American Major League Baseball player, member of the Hall of Fame
 Eddie Hall (born 1988), British strongman
 Braden Holtby (born 1989), Canadian ice hockey goaltender
 Kevin Iro (born 1968), New Zealand rugby league footballer
 Brian Jensen (footballer born 1975), Danish footballer
 Mark Labbett (born 1965), British television personality on the game show The Chase
 Brock Lesnar (born 1977), professional wrestler
 Maria Mandl (born 1912), Austrian World War II concentration camp leader
 Hildegard Mende (born 1922), German World War II concentration camp guard
 Max Mirnyi (born 1977), professional tennis player from Belarus
 Tendai Mtawarira (born 1985), Zimbabwean-born South Africa rugby player
 John Mugabi (born 1960), Ugandan retired middleweight boxer and world junior middleweight champion
 Miguel Ángel Nadal (born 1966), Spanish retired footballer
 Sretko Kalinić (born 1974), Serbian criminal 
 Jon Parkin (born 1981), English football player
 Shang Ping (born 1984), first Chinese basketball player to join a Euroleague club
 Daigo Umehara (born 1981), Japanese arcade fighting video game player
 Manu Vatuvei (born 1986), New Zealand rugby league footballer
 Gustav Wagner (1911–1980), Austrian SS-Oberscharführer at Sobibór extermination camp, "The Beast"
 L.A. Beast (Kevin Strahle), competitive eater.

See also
 
 
 The Beast (disambiguation)
 Mr Beast, studio album by the Scottish post-rock group Mogwai
 MrBeast (born 1998), American YouTuber
 Benjamin Butler (politician) (1813–1893), American politician and Governor of Massachusetts, American Civil War Union Army general nicknamed "Beast Butler" by Southern whites
 Irma Grese (1923–1945), German World War II female concentration camp guard, "The Beast of Belsen" and "The Beautiful Beast"
 Reinhard Heydrich (1904–1942), high-ranking German Nazi official, "The Blonde Beast"
 Ilse Koch (1906–1967), German World War II female concentration camp guard, "The Beast of Buchenwald"
 Josef Kramer (1906–1945), German commandant of Bergen-Belsen concentration camp, "The Beast of Belsen"
 Salvatore Riina (born 1930), former Sicilian Mafia leader nicknamed "La Belva" ("The Beast")
 Luis Garavito (born 1957), Colombian serial killer and rapist nicknamed "La Bestia" ("The Beast")
 Siert Bruins (born 1921), Dutch member of the SS and SD during World War II, "The Beast of Appingedam"
 Dennis Skinner (born 1932), British politician, "The Beast of Bolsover"
 Nuno Mindelis (born 1957), Angolan-born Brazilian blues guitarist and singer-songwriter, "The Beast from Brazil"
 Edward Paisnel (1925–1994), sex offender from the Channel Island of Jersey, "the beast of Jersey"
 Anatoly Onoprienko (1959–2013), Ukrainian serial killer, "The Beast of Ukraine"
 Maxi Rodríguez (born 1981), Argentine footballer, "La fiera" ("The beast")
 Álvaro Negredo (born 1985), Spanish football player, "La fiera de Vallecas" ("The beast of Vallecas")
 Gaius Antonius Hybrida, Roman Republic 1st century BC politician, nicknamed "Hybrida" ("half-beast")
 The Animal (nickname)

Lists of people by nickname